William Howard Quasha (19 May 1912 – 12 May 1996) was born in New York of Jewish Russian immigrants. He was a Lt. Col in the US Army, a lawyer with Mc Arthur's staff in WWII, and an Industrial Psychologist and Mechanical Engineer who co-authored the Revised Minnesota paper form board test still in use today assessing mechanical aptitude. He was Senior Warden, and Lay Reader of the Episcopal Church who later became the President and Chairman of St. Luke's Medical Center, The St. Luke's College of Medicine was later renamed the St. Luke's College of Medicine, William H. Quasha Memorial Foundation after his death.

Background
While in the Army he served as Enemy Property Custodian, War crimes prosecutor he worked for the U.S. government to protect U.S. holdings in the Philippines. He reviewed legal contracts and was responsible for preparation of decisions on contractual claims against the government and with other officers decided the validity and extent of these claims. He was responsible for liaison between U.S. Army Supply Arms and Services and the Commonwealth of Australia. He was decorated with a Bronze Star medal with 1 oak leaf cluster. He did his civic work serving as a Distinguished Eagel Scout and Grand Master of the Masons for the Asia Pacific Region.
He endeavored to reestablish relations between Masonry and the Catholic Church by paying a visit to the Pope in the Vatican. A man who truly loved and served God as he toured the country, and visited lodges he encouraged brothers to include prayers in their work.

Quasha served as Scoutmaster of Troop 1, American School. He joined the Executive Board of the Boy Scouts of the Philippines Manila Council in 1949, and later was conferred the Silver Tamaraw. He received the Silver Buffalo of the Boy Scouts of America in 1974.
In a speech to introduce President Clinton to the Filipino people he said "the Americans have no better friends than the Filipinos". Before his death he received an honorary doctorate from Lyceum and was recognized for his service to the Filipinos having facilitated the Fulbright Scholarships by Philippine President Fidel Ramos.  On his death he donated his estate to St. Luke's.
The Philippine Judicial System remembers him in Republic of the Philippines and/or Solicitor General v. William H. Quasha, August 17, 1972, the Supreme Court of the Philippines ruled that Americans could not own land in the Philippines beyond July 3, 1974, in effect ruling that Quasha had to give up ownership of his residential lot at Forbes Park, Makati municipality (now Forbes Park, Makati). The "Quasha law," which proved onerous for the American community in the Philippines, however, was later overturned by President Ferdinand Marcos citing the grandfather rights of Americans who owned property in the Philippines during the time of the commonwealth.

In 2000, the National Gallery of Australia acquired from the Quasha family the New Guinea portfolio of 27 prints by Australian photographer Max Dupain (1911–1992), acquired by William Quasha while Quasha was a captain in the US Army in Australia.

References

External links 
 
 

1912 births
1996 deaths
American expatriates in the Philippines
Masonic Grand Masters
Scouting in the Philippines
Anglican lay readers